Étienne de Rouen (died c. 1169), also Stephen of Rouen and , was a Norman Benedictine monk of Bec Abbey of the twelfth century, and a chronicler and poet. 

The dukes of Normandy commissioned and inspired epic literature to record and legitimise their rule, and Wace, Orderic Vitalis and Stephen were among those who wrote in their service. Stephen is known for his Latin verse chronicle Draco Normannicus ("Standard of the Normans"), a chronicle running from the eleventh century to 1169; it draws on Dudo of St. Quentin and William of Jumièges.: Poetically it is supposed that he was influenced by the Ilias of Simon Chèvre d'Or.

Stephen's work includes an elegy addressed to Waleran, Earl of Worcester, and he also made an abridgement of Quintilian.

References
Henri Omont, editor (1884) Le Dragon normand et autres poèmes d'Étienne de Rouen

Notes

French chroniclers
12th-century French historians
Norman Benedictines
1169 deaths
Year of birth unknown
12th-century Latin writers